Ignat Damyanov (born 13 July 1987) is a Bulgarian footballer who plays as a midfielder for Akademik Svishtov.

References

1987 births
Living people
Bulgarian footballers
Second Professional Football League (Bulgaria) players
First Professional Football League (Bulgaria) players
PFC Slavia Sofia players
PFC Svetkavitsa players
PFC Dobrudzha Dobrich players
PFC Spartak Varna players
PFC Akademik Svishtov players

Association football midfielders